Gilmar José da Silva Filho (born 28 November 1988 in São Paulo), commonly known as Gilmar, is a Brazilian footballer who plays as a forward for Balestier Khalsa  in the S.League.

Club career

Kelantan
On 16 April 2015, Gilmar signed with Kelantan during mid transfer window. He made 11 league appearances and 6 goals before left for Sarawak in December 2015.

Caxias
Gilmar signed with Brazilian side Caxias in January 2017. Gilmar scored his first goal for the club in a 1−0 victory over Veranópolis in a friendly match.

Perak
On 9 June 2017, Gilmar signed 18 months contract with Malaysian side Perak. Gilmar made his debut for Perak in a 2−3 win over Kedah and also scored his first goal in a league match on 1 July 2017.

Career statistics

Club

1 Includes Copa do Brasil and Malaysia FA Cup matches.
2 Includes Malaysia Cup matches.

Honours

Club
Perak TBG F.C.
 Malaysia Cup Winner (1): 2018

References

External links
 
 Gilmar Jose da Silva Filho at Etminan Brazil

1988 births
Living people
Brazilian footballers
Brazilian expatriate footballers
Association football forwards
Esporte Clube Mamoré players
Clube Atlético Hermann Aichinger players
GIF Sundsvall players
Esporte Clube Novo Hamburgo players
Esporte Clube Juventude players
Vila Nova Futebol Clube players
Esporte Clube Pelotas players
Clube Esportivo Lajeadense players
Kelantan FA players
Sarawak FA players
Perak F.C. players
Sociedade Esportiva e Recreativa Caxias do Sul players
Boa Esporte Clube players
Cuiabá Esporte Clube players
Campeonato Brasileiro Série B players
Campeonato Brasileiro Série D players
Malaysia Super League players
Brazilian expatriate sportspeople in Sweden
Brazilian expatriate sportspeople in Malaysia
Expatriate footballers in Sweden
Expatriate footballers in Malaysia
Footballers from São Paulo